In Norse mythology, Níðhöggr (Malice Striker, in Old Norse traditionally also spelled Níðhǫggr , often anglicized Nidhogg) is a dragon who gnaws at a root of the world tree, Yggdrasil. In historical Viking society, níð was a term for a social stigma, implying the loss of honor and the status of a villain. Thus, its name might refer to its role as a horrific monster in its action of chewing the corpses of the inhabitants of Náströnd: those guilty of murder, adultery, and oath-breaking.

Orthography

In the standardized Old Norse orthography, the name is spelled , but the letter  is frequently replaced with the Modern Icelandic  for reasons of familiarity or technical expediency.

The name can be represented in English texts with i for í; th, d or (rarely) dh for ð; o for ǫ and optionally without r as in Modern Scandinavian reflexes. The Modern Icelandic form  is also sometimes seen, with special characters or similarly anglicized. The Danish forms  and  can also be encountered; or Norwegian  and Swedish .

Prose Edda

According to the Gylfaginning part of Snorri Sturluson's Prose Edda, Níðhǫggr is a being which gnaws one of the three roots of Yggdrasill. It is sometimes believed that the roots are trapping the beast from the world. This root is placed over Niflheimr and Níðhǫggr gnaws it from beneath. The same source also says that "[t]he squirrel called Ratatoskr runs up and down the length of the Ash, bearing envious words between the eagle and Nídhǫggr [the snake]."

In the Skáldskaparmál section of the Prose Edda Snorri specifies Níðhǫggr as a serpent in a list of names of such creatures:

These are names for serpents: dragon, Fafnir, Jormungand, adder, Nidhogg, snake, viper, Goin, Moin, Grafvitnir, Grabak, Ofnir, Svafnir, masked one.

Snorri's knowledge of Níðhǫggr seems to come from two of the Eddic poems: Grímnismál and Völuspá.

Later in Skáldskaparmál, Snorri includes Níðhǫggr in a list of various terms and names for swords.

Poetic Edda

The poem Grímnismál identifies a number of beings which live in Yggdrasill. The tree suffers great hardship from all the creatures which live on it. The poem identifies Níðhǫggr as tearing at the tree from beneath and also mentions Ratatoskr as carrying messages between Níðhǫggr and the eagle who lives at the top of the tree. Snorri Sturluson often quotes Grímnismál and clearly used it as his source for this information.

The poem Völuspá mentions Níðhöggr/Níðhǫggr twice. The first instance is in its description of Náströnd.

Níðhöggr/Níðhǫggr is also mentioned at the end of Völuspá, where he is identified as a dragon and a serpent.

The context and meaning of this stanza are disputed. The most prevalent opinion is that the arrival of Níðhǫggr heralds Ragnarök and thus that the poem ends on a tone of ominous warning. It could be, however, as the prevalent themes of Norse mythology are those of change and renewal, that this could be a 'redemption' of the serpent, 'shedding' the corpses and beginning life anew, much like a macabre Phoenix, or perhaps, lifting the bodies of the righteous rulers mentioned two stanzas before (the stanza immediately before is considered spurious by translator Henry Adam Bellows), so that they can dwell in Gimle, and then either Níðhǫggr sinks, or the völva sinks, depending on the translation, and the poem ends.

Níðhǫggr is not mentioned elsewhere in any ancient source.

See also
 Zygarde

References

Bibliography

 Ásgeir Blöndal Magnússon (1989). Íslensk orðsifjabók. Reykjavík: Orðabók Háskólans.
 Bellows, Henry Adams (trans.) (1923) The Poetic Edda. New York: The American-Scandinavian Foundation. Available online in www.voluspa (org).
 Brodeur, Arthur Gilchrist (trans.) (1916). The Prose Edda by Snorri Sturluson. New York: The American-Scandinavian Foundation. Available at Google Books.
 Dronke, Ursula (1997). The Poetic Edda : Volume II : Mythological Poems. Oxford: Clarendon Press. In particular p. 18 and pp. 124–25.
 Eysteinn Björnsson (ed.). Snorra-Edda: Formáli & Gylfaginning : Textar fjögurra meginhandrita. 2005. Available online.
 Eysteinn Björnsson (ed.). Völuspá. Available online.
Faulkes, Anthony (transl. and ed.) (1987). Edda (Snorri Sturluson). Everyman. .
 Finnur Jónsson (1913). Goðafræði Norðmanna og Íslendinga eftir heimildum. Reykjavík: Hið íslenska bókmentafjelag.
 Finnur Jónsson (1931). Lexicon Poeticum. København: S. L. Møllers Bogtrykkeri.
 Lindow, John (2001). Handbook of Norse mythology. Santa Barbara: ABC-Clio. .
 Thorpe, Benjamin (tr.) (1866). Edda Sæmundar Hinns Froða: The Edda Of Sæmund The Learned. (2 vols.) London: Trübner & Co. Available online in the Norroena Society edition at Google Books.

Creatures in Norse mythology
European dragons
Legendary serpents